The West Chester Golden Rams baseball program represents West Chester University of Pennsylvania in baseball. The Golden Rams compete in the Pennsylvania State Athletic Conference. Led by former head coach Jad Prachniak, the Golden Rams claimed their first national championship in his first year, 2012. In 2017, West Chester claimed their second title. The Golden Rams play their home games at Serpico Stadium, named after Neil Serpico, a former head coach.

The baseball team hosted the Phillies on May 31, 1895 at West Chester for a mid season exhibition game. The Phillies won 14 to 3 before 2,500 fans.

References